Koernickanthe is a genus of plants. It contains only one recognized species, Koernickanthe orbiculata (Körn.) L.Andersson, native to Brazil, Bolivia and Suriname.

References

Marantaceae
Monotypic Zingiberales genera
Flora of Brazil
Flora of Bolivia
Flora of Suriname